Imad Touil (born 11 February 1989) is an Algerian middle distance runner who specialises in the 1500 metres.

At the 2008 World Junior Championships in Athletics in Bydgoszcz, Poland, Touil won a gold medal over 1500 metres. Touil was also part of the Algerian team at the 2009 World Championships.

He has a twin brother, Abdelmadjed, who is also a runner.

Personal best

References

External links

1989 births
Living people
Algerian male middle-distance runners
People from El Oued
World Athletics Championships athletes for Algeria
Mediterranean Games bronze medalists for Algeria
Athletes (track and field) at the 2013 Mediterranean Games
Universiade medalists in athletics (track and field)
Mediterranean Games medalists in athletics
Universiade gold medalists for Algeria
Medalists at the 2011 Summer Universiade
21st-century Algerian people